Frances Ward ("Fanny") Alger Custer (September 30, 1817 – November 29, 1889) was possibly the first plural wife of Joseph Smith, the founder of the Latter Day Saint movement.

Biography
Alger was born to Samuel Alger and Clarissa Hancock on September 30, 1817, in Rehoboth, Bristol County, Massachusetts, the fourth of eleven children. Samuel was a carpenter who had built a house for the father of future Church of Christ leader Heber C. Kimball. Clarissa was a sister of Levi W. Hancock, a stalwart member of what was to become the Church of Jesus Christ of Latter-day Saints.

The Algers first moved to Ashtabula, Ohio, and then to Mayfield, Ohio, ten miles southwest of the Mormon settlement at Kirtland, Ohio. In 1830, Samuel (and apparently Clarissa) were baptized into Mormonism and thus became some of its earliest converts.

In September 1836, after Fanny had spent some time as a teenage servant in the home of Joseph and Emma Smith, the Algers left Kirtland. Joseph Smith asked Fanny's uncle, Levi Hancock, to conduct her to Missouri, but she accompanied her parents instead. The Algers stopped in Dublin, Wayne County, Indiana, and there Fanny met and, on November 16, 1836, married Solomon Custer, a non-Mormon, listed in various censuses as a grocer, baker, and merchant. Although her parents continued on their way to Nauvoo, Illinois, and eventually Utah Territory, the Custers remained in Indiana. Fanny bore nine children, only two of whom survived her. In 1874, she joined the Universalist church in Dublin. Her funeral was held at the Dublin church after she died at the home of her son in Indianapolis, Indiana, on November 29, 1889.

Many years later, an early acquaintance remembered the young Alger of Kirtland as a "very nice and comely young woman ... toward whom ... everyone seemed partial for the amiability of her character." Her obituary reported that in Indiana she was "generally beloved by all who knew her and was noted for her benevolence of spirit and generous-heartedness."

Relationship with Joseph Smith

In January 1838, some months after the Algers had left Kirtland, Oliver Cowdery, one of the Three Witnesses to the authenticity of the Book of Mormon, wrote to his brother concerning his indignation at Smith's relationship with Alger. Cowdery said he had discussed with Smith the "dirty, nasty, filthy scrape of his and Fanny Alger's ... in which I strictly declared that I had never deserted from the truth in the matter, and as I supposed was admitted by himself." As Richard Bushman has noted, Smith "never denied a relationship with Alger, but insisted it was not adulterous. He wanted it on record that he had never confessed to such a sin." The best statement Smith could obtain from Cowdery was an affirmation that Smith had never acknowledged himself to have been guilty of adultery. "That," wrote Bushman, "was all Joseph wanted: an admission that he had not termed the Alger affair adulterous." In April 1838, Mormon leaders meeting as the Far West High Council excommunicated Cowdery, in part because he had "seemed to insinuate" that Smith was guilty of adultery.

At this point, Alger disappeared from the historical record of the Church of Jesus Christ of Latter Day Saints, only to have a number of stories about her relationship with Smith arise during the late-19th century. All of these second-hand witnesses, Mormon and non-Mormon, agreed that Smith had married Alger as a plural wife. In his compendium of Smith's plural marriages, Todd Compton discusses this late-nineteenth-century evidence and its differing reliability, concluding that Smith's relationship with Alger, though fleeting, was more than a casual sexual affair and that she was "one of Joseph Smith's earliest plural wives."

Historian Lawrence Foster disputed Compton's assumption, arguing that although "contemporary evidence strongly suggests" that Smith and Alger engaged in sexual relations, the evidence does not indicate that the relationship was "viewed either by Smith himself or by his associates at the time as a 'marriage.'" Foster noted that before Smith's first documented plural marriage to Louisa Beaman in April 1841, Smith's "earlier sexual relationships may have been considered marriages, but we lack convincing contemporary evidence supporting such an interpretation."

After Smith's death, when Alger's brother asked her about her relationship with Smith, she replied, "That is all a matter of my own. And I have nothing to communicate."

See also 
List of Joseph Smith's wives

Notes

References 

.

.
.
.

1816 births
1889 deaths
Latter Day Saints from Ohio
History of the Latter Day Saint movement
People from Rehoboth, Massachusetts
Mormonism-related controversies
American Universalists
People from Ashtabula, Ohio
People from Cuyahoga County, Ohio
Wives of Joseph Smith